Chicken 226 is an Indian reserve of the Black Lake Denesuline First Nation in Saskatchewan.

Etymology

The three Chicken reserves were named after a Chief Chicken, early leader of the Black Lake band.

References

Indian reserves in Saskatchewan
Division No. 18, Saskatchewan